Andrey Varankow (born 8 February 1989), also spelled Andrey Voronkov, is a Belarusian footballer who plays as a forward for Bruneian club DPMM FC of the Singapore Premier League.

Club career

Varankow was on the books of Ukrainian powerhouses Dynamo Kiev in the first six years of his career, going frequently out on loan while starring for his country at youth and full international levels. He severed ties with Dynamo in 2013 and returned to Belarus with initially FC Slavia Mozyr and then FC Gorodeya, performing modestly for a few years.

Towards the end of 2018, Varankow attended a trial at Bruneian professional club DPMM FC who were in the market for an import striker after the departure of Volodymyr Pryyomov. He impressed head coach Adrian Pennock who signed him along with Charlie Clough and Blake Ricciuto for the 2019 Singapore Premier League campaign, with club hierarchy citing his international experience as a huge deal.

Varankow made his official debut for DPMM on 3 March away to Home United when he scored in the 21st minute for the only goal of the game. He would then made himself known to everyone in his fifth game against Balestier Khalsa, hitting the back of the net five times in a 1–7 victory.

The one month break proved detrimental for DPMM who proceeded to lose to Tampines Rovers right after the league resumed. This also marked a barren spell for Varankow who suddenly could not score for the next five games before being taken off injured at half-time in a 3–1 defeat to Hougang United on 19 July. With Hougang catching DPMM on the league table and their striker Faris Ramli scoring for fun, the mid-season acquisition of brothers Adi Said and Hakeme Yazid Said cushioned the blow of Varankow's absence for DPMM in a morale-boosting 3–0 win against Geylang International.

Varankow rediscovered his scoring boots upon his return in September, netting a brace in a 1–4 victory over Balestier Khalsa which included a powerful free-kick into the bottom corner. A fortnight later, he scored a hat-trick against Warriors FC to pull DPMM ahead of the pack in the title race. The following day, title rivals Hougang faltered in a 4–4 draw to Geylang which sealed DPMM as league winners. Varankow finished the season as top scorer with 21 goals as well as joint-highest number of assists with 10.

In 2021, DPMM elected to play the 2021 Brunei Super League using their first team. Varankow made his domestic league debut on 27 June, scoring a hat-trick against BAKES FC in a 16–1 victory. He then scored four goals in a 15–0 romp of Rimba Star FC the following fixture, then scored seven in the 13–0 demolishing of BSRC FC on 11 July. He continued his barrage of strikes against Bruneian clubs with six goals in a 8-0 win over Wijaya FC on 25 July. 

After being out of contract for 2022 he returned to DPMM the next year for the 2023 Singapore Premier League. He scored his first goal since coming back in the 3–4 defeat against Balestier Khalsa on 10 March.

International career
Varankow debuted in Belarus national football team in a Euro 2008 qualifying match against Luxembourg on 13 October 2007. He was a member of the Belarus U21 that finished in 3rd place at the 2011 UEFA European Under-21 Football Championship, playing all five matches and scoring twice, against Iceland U21 and Spain U21. He was part of the Belarusian team at the 2012 Summer Olympics, scoring a goal against Egypt.

Career statistics

Club

Notes

Honours

Club
Dynamo Kyiv
Ukrainian Super Cup winner: 2007
Brunei DPMM FC
 Singapore Premier League: 2019

References

External links

Profile at Official Site FFU

 Andrey Varankow Interview
 Andrei Voronkov: “I took it for granted when I heard that they were singing about me”

1989 births
Living people
People from Mazyr
Belarusian footballers
Association football forwards
Belarus international footballers
Olympic footballers of Belarus
Footballers at the 2012 Summer Olympics
Belarusian expatriate footballers
Expatriate footballers in Ukraine
Belarusian expatriate sportspeople in Ukraine
Ukrainian Premier League players
Expatriate footballers in Brunei
Expatriate footballers in Singapore
FC Dynamo Kyiv players
FC Dynamo-2 Kyiv players
FC Obolon-Brovar Kyiv players
FC Kryvbas Kryvyi Rih players
FC Karpaty Lviv players
FC Neman Grodno players
FC Metalurh Zaporizhzhia players
FC Slavia Mozyr players
FC Gorodeya players
DPMM FC players
Sportspeople from Gomel Region